Freda Dowie (22 July 1928 – 10 August 2019) was an English actress. She was born in Carlisle, Cumberland. She was married to the art critic and film-maker David Thompson.

Her television credits include: Dixon of Dock Green, Doomwatch, Edna, the Inebriate Woman, Upstairs, Downstairs, I, Claudius, The Old Curiosity Shop, The Pickwick Papers, Lillie, Oranges Are Not the Only Fruit, Our Friends in the North, Common As Muck, Lovejoy, Agatha Christie's Poirot, Crown Court and Heartbeat.

Dowie frequently portrayed long-suffering roles, most notably as the Mother in the 1988 film Distant Voices, Still Lives, for which she was nominated for a European Film Award. Her film career also includes roles in Subterfuge (1968), The Omen (1976), The Monk (1990), Butterfly Kiss (1995), Jude (1996), Cider with Rosie (1998), and Fragile (2005).

Filmography

References

External links

1928 births
2019 deaths
English television actresses
People from Carlisle, Cumbria
English film actresses
20th-century English actresses
21st-century English actresses